The following is a list of Michigan State Historic Sites in Berrien County, Michigan. Sites marked with a dagger (†) are also listed on the National Register of Historic Places in Berrien County, Michigan.


Current listings

See also
 National Register of Historic Places listings in Berrien County, Michigan

Sources
 Historic Sites Online – Berrien County. Michigan State Housing Developmental Authority. Accessed January 22, 2011.

References

Berrien County
State Historic Sites
Tourist attractions in Berrien County, Michigan